Åmot is a locality situated in Ockelbo Municipality, Gävleborg County, Sweden with 277 inhabitants in 2010.

Climate
Åmot has a climate in the boundary zone between continental and subarctic.

References

Populated places in Ockelbo Municipality
Gästrikland